Horn Concerto No. 2 may refer to:

 Horn Concerto No. 2 (Mozart)
 Horn Concerto No. 2 (Strauss)